Hayuliang is one of the 60 assembly constituencies of  Arunachal Pradesh a north east state of India. It is part of Arunachal East Lok Sabha constituency.

Members of Legislative Assembly
 1990: Khapriso Krong, Indian National Congress
 1995: Kalikho Pul, Indian National Congress
 1999: Kalikho Pul, Indian National Congress
 2004: Kalikho Pul, Indian National Congress
 2009: Kalikho Pul, Indian National Congress
 2014: Kalikho Pul, Indian National Congress
 2016 (By elections): Dasanglu Pul, Bharatiya Janata Party

Election results

2019

2016 by-elections

See also

 Hayuliang
 Anjaw district
 List of constituencies of Arunachal Pradesh Legislative Assembly

References

Assembly constituencies of Arunachal Pradesh
Anjaw district